Tappeh (also known as Ţālebābād) is a village in Torkaman Rural District, in the Central District of Urmia County, West Azerbaijan Province, Iran. At the 2006 census, its population was 23, in 4 families.

References 

Populated places in Urmia County